Naro may refer to:

 Naro language, a Khoe language from Botswana
 Naro Space Center, South Korean launch center
 Naro-1, South Korean launcher

Places
 Naro, Sicily, Italy
 Naro, Solomon Islands
 Naro, island and barangay of Cawayan, Masbate, Philippines
 Naro-Fominsky District, district in Moscow Oblast, Russia
 Naro-Fominsk, town and the administrative center of Naro-Fominsky District
 Naro Gewog, village in Thimphu District, Bhutan
 Naro Moru, town in central Kenya
 Naro Moru River, Kenya

People
 Costantino Patrizi Naro (1798–1876), cardinal
 Naro Hari Shrestha (b. 1996), an Indian professional footballer

Acronym
The acronym NARO may refer to:
 National Agriculture and Food Research Organization (Japan)
 North American river otter
 Nuclear Accident Response Organisation (United Kingdom)

See also
 Nara (disambiguation)
 Narro (disambiguation)
 Nero (disambiguation)